Timothy Jordan may refer to:

 Timothy Jordan II (1981–2005), American musician
 Timothy S. Jordan (1827–?), member of the Wisconsin State Assembly